Labour Party or Labor Party is a name used by many political parties. Many of these parties have links to the trade union movement or organised labour in general. Labour parties can exist across the political spectrum, but most are centre-left or left-wing parties. The largest Labour parties, such as the UK Labour Party, Australian Labor Party, New Zealand Labour Party and Israeli Labor Party, tend to have a social democratic or democratic socialist orientation.

Angola
MPLA, known for some years as "Popular Movement for the Liberation of Angola – Labour Party"

Antigua and Barbuda
Antigua and Barbuda Labour Party

Argentina 
Labour Party (Argentina)

Armenia
All Armenian Labour Party
United Labour Party (Armenia)

Australia
Australian Labor Party
Australian Labor Party (Australian Capital Territory Branch)
Australian Labor Party (New South Wales Branch)
Australian Labor Party (Queensland Branch)
Australian Labor Party (South Australian Branch)
Australian Labor Party (Tasmanian Branch)
Australian Labor Party (Victorian Branch)
Democratic Labour Party (Australia)
Progressive Labour Party (Australia)
Industrial Socialist Labor Party, active late-1910s and early 1920s

Bahamas
Labour Party (Bahamas)

Barbados
Barbados Labour Party
Democratic Labour Party (Barbados)

Belarus
Belarusian Labour Party

Belgium
Belgian Labour Party, active 1885–1940

Bermuda
Progressive Labour Party (Bermuda)

Brazil
Brazilian Labour Party (historical), 1945–1965
Democratic Labour Party (Brazil), since 1979
Brazilian Labour Party (current), since 1979
Brazilian Labour Renewal Party, since 1994
Avante (political party), since 2017, Labour Party of Brazil, 1989–2017
Podemos (Brazil), since 2016, National Labour Party, 1995–2016
Act (Brazil), since 2021, Christian Labour Party, 2000–2021
Labour Social Party, 1996–2003
Brazilian Renovator Labour Party, 1993–1994
Renovator Labour Party, 1985–1993
Labour Social Party, 1988–1993
Labour Liberal Party, 1991–1993
Communitarian Labour Party, 1992
Party of Labour Unity's Movement, 1990
Agrarian Socialist and Labour Renovator Party, 1985–1990
National Labour Party, 1986–1989
Reformer Labour Party, 1985–1986
National Labour Party, 1945–1965
Renovator Labour Movement, 1959–1965
Social Labour Party, 1947–1965
Labour Republican Party, 1948–1965
Orienting Labour Party, 1945–1951
National Union of Labor, 1948–1965

Burkina Faso
Party of Labour of Burkina, active 1990–1996
Voltaic Labour Party, active circa 1970

Burundi
Independent Labor Party

Canada
Canadian Labour Party, active 1917–1929
Labour candidates and parties in Canada, active 1870s–1960s
Co-operative Commonwealth Federation (Farmer-Labour-Socialist), active 1932–1961
Labor-Progressive Party, the legal political organization of the Communist Party of Canada active 1943–1959
North American Labour Party, an unregistered party active circa 1970s
Cape Breton Labour Party, active 1970–1984

Republic of the Congo
Congolese Party of Labour

Croatia
Croatian Labourists – Labour Party
Croatian Labour Party

Curaçao
Labour Party People's Crusade

Dominica
Dominica Labour Party

Estonia
Estonian Labour Party, active 1917–1932

Fiji
Fiji Labour Party

Georgia
Georgian Labour Party

Gibraltar
Gibraltar Socialist Labour Party
Gibraltar Labour Party, active 2003–2005

Greenland
Labour Party (Greenland), active 1979–1983

Grenada
Grenada United Labour Party

Guatemala
Guatemalan Party of Labour – Alamos, an underground communist party active circa 1980s
Guatemalan Party of Labour – Communist Party, an underground communist party active 1979–1983

Guyana
British Guiana Labour Party, active 1946–1950
Guyana Labour Party, active circa 1990s

Hong Kong
Labour Party (Hong Kong)

India
Independent Labour Party (India), active circa 1936–1938
Labour Kisan Party of Hindustan, active 1923–1925

Indonesia
Labour Party of Indonesia, active 1945–1948
Labour Party (Indonesia, 1949), active 1949–1955
Labour Party (Indonesia, 1998) active 1998–2021
Labour Party (Indonesia, 2021)

Ireland
Labour Party (Ireland)

Isle of Man
Manx Labour Party

Israel
Israeli Labor Party

Italy
Labour Federation (Italy), active 1994–1998
Labour Party (Italy), active since 2012

Jamaica
Jamaica Labour Party
National Labour Party (Jamaica), active circa 1950s and 1960s

Japan
Japan Labour-Farmer Party, active 1926–1928
Farmer-Labour Party, active 1925

Korea

Labor Party (South Korea)
Democratic Labor Party (South Korea)

Latvia
Workers' Party (Latvia), active 1920–1923 and 1997–2008

Liberia
Labor Party of Liberia

Lithuania
Labour Party (Lithuania)
Democratic Labour Party of Lithuania, active 1989–2001

Malaysia
Labour Party of Malaya, active 1952–1969

Malta
Labour Party (Malta)

Mauritius
Labour Party (Mauritius)

Mexico
Labor Party (Mexico)

Moldova
Labour Party (Moldova)

Morocco
Labour Party (Morocco)

Namibia
South West African Labour Party, active circa 1970s

Netherlands
Labour Party (Netherlands)
Central Democratic Labour Party, active 1933

New Caledonia
Labour Party (New Caledonia)

New Zealand
New Zealand Labour Party
New Zealand Labour Party (1910), active 1910–1912
United Labour Party (New Zealand), active 1912–1916
Democratic Labour Party (New Zealand), active circa 1940s
NewLabour Party, active 1989–2000

Nigeria
Labour Party (Nigeria)

Norway
Labour Party (Norway)
Social Democratic Labour Party of Norway, active circa 1920s

Panama
Labor Party (Panama), active 1925–1930

Papua New Guinea
Bougainville Labour Party
PNG Labour Party
People's Labour Party (Papua New Guinea)

Pakistan
Labour Party Pakistan

Philippines
Partido ng Manggagawa
Partido ng Manggagawa at Magsasaka

Poland
Labour Union
Polish Labour Party-August 80, active 2001–2017
Labour Faction (1937), active 1937–1946
Labor Party (Partia Pracy), active 1925–1930
Labour Faction (1989), active 1989–2005

Puerto Rico
Labor Party (Puerto Rico), active 1899–1915

Romania
Labor Party (Romania)

Russia
Labour Party (Russia)

Saint Kitts and Nevis
Saint Kitts and Nevis Labour Party

Saint Lucia
Saint Lucia Labour Party

Saint Vincent and the Grenadines
Unity Labour Party

Samoa
Western Samoa Labour Party, active circa 1990s

Senegal
Labour Party of Sine Saloum, active circa 1960

Singapore
Labour Front
Labour Party (Singapore)

Slovakia
Labour Party (Slovakia)

Solomon Islands
Solomon Islands Labour Party
Labour Party (Solomon Islands), active 1970–1971

South Africa
Labour Party (South Africa)
Labour Party (South Africa, 1969)
Natal Labour Party
New Labour Party (South Africa)
Transvaal Independent Labour Party

Sri Lanka
Ceylon Labour Party

Suriname
Surinamese Labour Party

Switzerland
Swiss Party of Labour

Tanzania
Tanzania Labour Party

Taiwan
Labor Party (Taiwan)

Thailand
Labour Party (Thailand)

Trinidad and Tobago

 Trinidad Labour Party
 Democratic Labour Party
 United Labour Front
 Social Democratic Labour Party of Trinidad and Tobago
 Caribbean National Labour Party

Turkey
Labour Party (Turkey)

Ukraine
Labour Party Ukraine
Labour Ukraine

United Kingdom
Labour Party (UK), one of two main political parties in the United Kingdom
Scottish Labour Party, division of the party for Scotland
Welsh Labour, division of the party for Wales
London Labour, division of the party for London
Labour Party in Northern Ireland, the unregistered division of the party for Northern Ireland
Labour – Federation of Labour Groups
Newtownabbey Labour Party
Republican Labour Party
Social Democratic and Labour Party
Socialist Labour Party (UK)

Former
Belfast Labour Party
Communist Labour Party (Scotland)
Democratic Labour Party (UK, 1972)
Democratic Labour Party (UK, 1998), a minor party in Walsall, England
Independent Labour Party
Irish Labour Party in Northern Ireland
Labour Party of Northern Ireland
National Labour Organisation
Northern Ireland Labour Party
Republican Labour Party, in Northern Ireland
Scottish Labour Party (1888)

United States
Labor Party (United States, 1996)
Socialist Labor Party of America, established 1876

Former
American Labor Party, 1936–1956
American Labor Party (1932), active until 1935
Communist Labor Party of North America, 1953–1974
Farmer–Labor Party, 1918–1944
Greenback Labor Party, active 1874–1889
Labor Party (Hawaii), 1908
Labor Party (United States, 19th century), several parties
Labor Party of the United States, active circa 1919
Minnesota Farmer–Labor Party, 1918–1944
Revolutionary Socialist Labor Party
Union Labor Party (California), active 1901–1912
U.S. Labor Party, a short-lived LaRouchite political party active circa 1970s

Vanuatu
 Vanuatu Labour Party

Zimbabwe
Zimbabwe Labour Party

See also
Labour government (disambiguation), a list of several Labour governments
List of Labour parties
Labour Party leadership election (disambiguation)
Party of Labour (disambiguation)
Workers' Party